George Kleine (1864June 8, 1931) was an American film producer and cinema pioneer.

Biography
Klein's father, Charles, was a New York optician who sold optical devices and stereopticons. Klein joined the family firm, moving to  Chicago in 1893 where he set up the Kleine Optical Company. In 1896, the company started selling film-making equipment, and in 1899, the company obtained an exclusive arrangement with Thomas Edison to sell his film and equipment in the Chicago area.

In 1903, Kleine started distributing Biograph films as well as European films and was a pioneer in renting films to theatres. He became involved in patent disputes with Thomas Edison in 1908, causing members of the industry to establish the Motion Picture Patents Company. He founded Kalem Company, an American film studio in New York City in 1907 with Samuel Long, and Frank J. Marion. The company was named for their initials, K, L, and M. Kleine.  Klein was involved in the company for only a short period of time; however, it was a profitable investment for him, as his partners were soon successful enough to buy out his shares at a considerable premium.

Kleine was a national distributor of silent movies in the 1910s, a notable example being Essanay Studios 1918 film, “Men Who Have Made Love to Me” starring Mary MacLane.

Kleine retired in 1928 and died in Los Angeles, California, in 1931.

His papers are retained by the Library of Congress.

Filmography

References

External links 

 
 , a lecture by Joel Frykholm, Kluge Fellow, The John W. Kluge Center, Library of Congress, February 14, 2013.

American film studio executives
American film production company founders
Cinema pioneers
1864 births
1931 deaths